Mavaluy, also rendered as Mavalu, may refer to:
 Mavaluy-e Olya
 Mavaluy-e Sofla